Ruth Park Golf Course is in the heart of University City, Missouri. It is a 9-hole facility with driving range available for anyone to play year round. Residents of University City get a reduced rate if they present a University ID card produced at the Centennial Commons.

Course History

Founded in 1931, the course was designed by Robert Foulis who was an assistant at St. Andrews in Scotland prior to coming over to the United States. Foulis also designed other local courses, including the original Forest Park Golf Course as well as Normandie Golf Club, which is the oldest public course west of the Mississippi River. Ruth Park had plans to become an 18 hole facility, but that never ended up materializing

Layout

Ruth Park Golf Course has a unique design that uses the slightly hilly terrain. The fairways are very wide throughout, but the greens are quite small. Several holes have out of bounds to the right off the tee. The course has undergone some work as of late to improve the fairways, and the transition to completely zoysia fairways, with bent grass greens. The second, sixth, and seventh hole  are tree lined. There is a small practice putting green to go along with the driving range.

Scorecard

Source:

References

External links
Official website

Golf clubs and courses in Missouri
Buildings and structures in St. Louis County, Missouri
1931 establishments in Missouri